Torridge is a local government district in north Devon, England. Its council is based in Bideford. Other towns and villages in the district include Holsworthy, Great Torrington, Hartland, and Westward Ho!. The island of Lundy is administratively part of the district. To the south of the district bordering Cornwall, near Welcombe, the rugged coastline has a wild untouched beauty, due to its inaccessibility, but the South West Coast Path is well defined. The district is named after the River Torridge.

Governance

The district was formed on 1 April 1974, under the Local Government Act 1972, by the merger of the boroughs of Bideford and Great Torrington, the Northam urban district, Bideford Rural District, Holsworthy Rural District and Torrington Rural District.

Torridge District Council is elected every four years, with currently 36 councillors being elected at each election. In 2007, Torridge registered the high number of opposed candidates in the country, with seven. Independents have had a strong presence on the council for much of its history, with no political party having won a majority until 2015. In 2015 the Conservative party won a small majority of 2 with 19 of the seats on the council, however the council returned to no overall control in 2019 after a large number of independents were elected.

The political composition of the borough has been as follows:

Services
Services provided by Torridge District Council to the local community include the administration of council tax and local benefits, transportation services, road maintenance, the provision of car parking services, the collection of refuse and the recycling of waste, planning and building control, housing services, the provision of sport and leisure facilities, libraries, schools and colleges, social care and health, environmental services, business-related services and contingency planning.

TorridgeCVS is a charitable organisation providing vulnerable people across the Torridge district with day-to-day living assistance. It provides advice, befriending schemes, support for carers, help to older people and help with charitable fund-raising, liaising with voluntary and community groups where necessary. It offers placements for individuals who want to get more involved in their local communities and relies on local volunteers, with over 2000 volunteers registered. It has been in operation since 1988 and is a member of NAVCA, the National Association for Voluntary and Community Action, being largely funded by Devon County Council and Torridge District Council.

See also 
North Devon Coast – AONB
 Grade I listed buildings in Torridge
 Grade II* listed buildings in Torridge

References

 
Non-metropolitan districts of Devon